The American Convention on Human Rights, also known as the Pact of San José, is an international human rights instrument. It was adopted by many countries in the Western Hemisphere in San José, Costa Rica, on 22 November 1969. It came into force after the eleventh instrument of ratification (that of Grenada) was deposited on 18 July 1978.

The bodies responsible for overseeing compliance with the Convention are the Inter-American Commission on Human Rights and the Inter-American Court of Human Rights, both of which are organs of the Organization of American States (OAS).

Content and purpose
According to its preamble, the purpose of the Convention is "to consolidate in this hemisphere, within the framework of democratic institutions, a system of personal liberty and social justice based on respect for the essential rights of man."

Chapter I establishes the general obligation of the states parties to uphold the rights set forth in the Convention to all persons under their jurisdiction, and to adapt their domestic laws to bring them into line with the Convention. The 23 articles of Chapter II give a list of individual civil and political rights due to all persons, including the right to life "in general, from the moment of conception", to humane treatment, to a fair trial, to privacy, to freedom of conscience, freedom of assembly, freedom of movement, etc. Article 15 prohibits "any propaganda for war and any advocacy of national, racial, or religious hatred that constitute incitement to lawless violence or to any other similar action against any person on any grounds including those of race, color, religion, language, or national origin" to be considered as offence punishable by law. This provision is established under influence of  Article 20 of the International Covenant of Civil and Political Rights. The single article in Chapter III deals with economic, social, and cultural rights.
The somewhat cursory treatment given  to this issue here was expanded some ten years later with the Protocol of San Salvador (see below).

Chapter IV describes those circumstances in which certain rights can be temporarily suspended, such as during states of emergency, and the formalities to be followed for such suspension to be valid. However, it does not authorize any suspension of Article 3 (right to juridical personality), Article 4 (right to life), Article 5 (right to humane treatment), Article 6 (freedom from slavery), Article 9 (freedom from ex post facto laws), Article 12 (freedom of conscience and religion), Article 17 (right to family), Article 18 (right to the name), Article 19 (rights of the child), Article 20 (right to nationality), or Article 23 (right to participate in government).

Chapter V, with a nod to the balance between rights and duties enshrined in the earlier American Declaration of the Rights and Duties of Man, points out that individuals have responsibilities as well as rights.

Chapters VI, VII, VIII, and IX contain provisions for the creation and operation of the two bodies responsible for overseeing compliance with the Convention: the Inter-American Commission, based in Washington, D.C., United States, and the Inter-American Court, headquartered in San José, Costa Rica.

Chapter X deals with mechanisms for ratifying the Convention, amending it or placing reservations in it, or denouncing it. Various transitory provisions are set forth in Chapter XI.

In the ensuing years, the states parties to the American Convention have supplemented its provisions with two additional protocols.

The first, the Additional Protocol to the American Convention on Human Rights in the area of Economic, Social, and Cultural Rights (more commonly known as the "Protocol of San Salvador"), was opened for signature in the city of San Salvador, El Salvador, on 17 November 1988. It represented an attempt to take the inter-American human rights system to a higher level by enshrining its protection of so-called second-generation rights in the economic, social, and cultural spheres. The protocol's provisions cover such areas as the right to work, the right to health, the right to food, and the right to education. It came into effect on 16 November 1999 and has been ratified by 16 nations (see below).

The second, the Protocol to the American Convention on Human Rights to Abolish the Death Penalty, was adopted at Asunción, Paraguay, on 8 June 1990. While Article 4 of the American Convention had already placed severe restrictions on the states' ability to impose the death penalty – only applicable for the most serious crimes; no reinstatement once abolished; not to be used for political offenses or common crimes; not to be used against those aged under 18 or over 70, or against pregnant women – signing this protocol formalizes a state's solemn commitment to refrain from using capital punishment in any peacetime circumstance. To date it has been ratified by 13 nations (see below).

Inter-American Court's Interpretation
The Inter-American Court makes a broad interpretation of the American Convention.  It interprets it according to the pro hominem principle, in an evolutive fashion and making use of other treaties and soft law.  The result is that, in practice, the Inter-American Court modifies the content of the American Convention.

Ratifications

, 25 of the 35 OAS's member states have ratified the Convention, while two have denounced it subsequently, and one of the two ratified it repeatedly, leaving 24 active parties:

Trinidad and Tobago denounced the Convention on 26 May 1998 (effective 26 May 1999) over the death penalty issue. Venezuela denounced the Convention on 10 September 2012 accusing the Inter-American Court and Commission to undermine its Government's stability by interfering with its domestic affairs. Necessary reforms of the institution were blocked. Therefore, it would henceforth increase its cooperation with the United Nations Human Rights Council.
Denunciations, according to Article 78 of the ACHR, become effective one year after having been declared. They do not release the state party from its obligations resulting from acts that have occurred before the effective date of denunciation. In 2019, Venezuela re-ratified the convention.

The treaty is open to all OAS member states, although to date it has not been ratified by Canada or several of the English-speaking Caribbean nations; the United States signed it in 1977 but has not proceeded with ratification.

Canada did at one point seriously consider ratification, but has decided against it, despite being in principle in favour of such a treaty. The ACHR, having been largely drafted by the predominantly Roman Catholic nations of Latin America, contains anti-abortion provisions, specifically, Article 4.1:

This conflicts with the current legality of abortions in Canada. Although Canada could ratify the convention with a reservation with respect to abortion (as did Mexico), that would contradict Canada's stated opposition to the making of reservations to human rights treaties. Another solution would be for the other states to remove the anti-abortion provisions, but that is unlikely to occur due to strong opposition to abortion in those countries.

See also
 Human rights
 Fetal rights
 Women's rights
 International human rights law
 American Declaration of the Rights and Duties of Man

Notes

External links

 American Convention on Human Rights (text)
 Inter-American Commission on Human Rights
 Inter-American Court of Human Rights

Human rights instruments
Organization of American States treaties
Human rights in Latin America
Treaties concluded in 1969
Treaties entered into force in 1978
Indigenous law
Treaties of Argentina
Treaties of Barbados
Treaties of Bolivia
Treaties of Brazil
Treaties of Chile
Treaties of Colombia
Treaties of Costa Rica
Treaties of Dominica
Treaties of the Dominican Republic
Treaties of Ecuador
Treaties of El Salvador
Treaties of Grenada
Treaties of Guatemala
Treaties of Haiti
Treaties of Honduras
Treaties of Jamaica
Treaties of Mexico
Treaties of Nicaragua
Treaties of Panama
Treaties of Paraguay
Treaties of Peru
Treaties of Suriname
Treaties of Uruguay
1969 in Costa Rica
Inter-American Court of Human Rights
Anti–death penalty treaties